Nigel Traverso (born 18 November 1958) is an American field hockey player. He competed at the 1984 Summer Olympics in Los Angeles.

Personal life
Traverso was born in Trinidad and Tobago on 18 November 1958, growing up in Port of Spain. He emigrated with his family to the United States in 1977, settling in Queens. He gained US citizenship in 1982.

References

External links

1958 births
Living people
American male field hockey players
Olympic field hockey players of the United States
Field hockey players at the 1984 Summer Olympics